Quentin LaMar Cook (born September 8, 1940) is an American religious leader and former lawyer and business executive who is currently a member of the Quorum of the Twelve Apostles in the Church of Jesus Christ of Latter-day Saints (LDS Church). Currently, he is the eighth most senior apostle in the church.

Biographical background
Born in Logan, Utah, Cook is among three children of Bernice Kimball and J. Vernon Cook. He is a great-great grandson of LDS Church apostle Heber C. Kimball and great-grandson of David Patten Kimball.

Raised in Logan, Cook attended Logan High School, where he participated in many sports, including football, basketball, baseball, and track. At Logan High, he was a teammate of future NFL great Merlin Olsen.

From 1960 to 1962, Cook served as an LDS Church missionary in England, where he and Jeffrey R. Holland served as companions, with Marion D. Hanks as mission president. After his return, he married his high school sweetheart, Mary Gaddie, in the Logan Utah Temple on November 30, 1962. He graduated from Utah State University in 1963 with a bachelor's degree in political science and from Stanford Law School in 1966.

The Cooks moved to Hillsborough, California, where they had three children. Cook worked for 27 years as a corporate attorney, becoming a managing partner of Carr, McClellan, Ingersoll, Thompson and Horn in the San Francisco Bay area.  Later in his career, he served as president and chief executive officer of California Healthcare System (CHS) for three years and then as vice chairman of Sutter Health System. Cook did pro bono work as a city attorney for 14 years.

Cook's work in privatizing hospitals in California involved some controversy.  As an attorney representing public hospital districts, he negotiated deals favorable to nonprofit healthcare corporations before leaving to become an executive with those corporations.  Critics claimed the deal quietly gave public revenues to private interests.  In a lawsuit to regain control of the hospital, the districts alleged this was a conflict of interest and violated their public mission, but the court found that statute of limitations had expired.  The hospital became part of CHS, which later joined Sutter Health, both of which held Cook as a top executive.

LDS Church service
Within the LDS Church, Cook has served as a bishop, counselor in a stake presidency, president of the church's San Francisco California Stake, regional representative, and area seventy.

Cook was called as a general authority and member of the Second Quorum of the Seventy on April 6, 1996.  He was transferred to the First Quorum of the Seventy on April 5, 1998. He was appointed as a member of the Presidency of the Seventy on August 1, 2007. As a general authority, Cook served in the presidency in the church's Philippines Area, as president of the Pacific and North America Northwest areas, and as executive director of the Missionary Department.

On October 6, 2007, Cook was sustained as a member of the Quorum of the Twelve Apostles, filling a vacancy created by Henry B. Eyring being appointed to the First Presidency, following the death of James E. Faust. As a member of the Quorum of the Twelve, Cook is accepted by the church as a prophet, seer, and revelator.

Works

See also
Council on the Disposition of the Tithes

Notes

References

"Elder Quentin L. Cook of the Seventy", Ensign, May 1996

External links
General Authorities and General Officers: Elder Quentin L. Cook

1940 births
Living people
Apostles (LDS Church)
American health care chief executives
American Mormon missionaries in England
California lawyers
Members of the First Quorum of the Seventy (LDS Church)
People from Logan, Utah
Presidents of the Seventy (LDS Church)
Utah State University alumni
Stanford University alumni
Regional representatives of the Twelve
Area seventies (LDS Church)
20th-century Mormon missionaries
American general authorities (LDS Church)
Religious leaders from California
People from Hillsborough, California
Latter Day Saints from Utah
Latter Day Saints from California